Telkamp is a surname. Notable people with the surname include:

Eberhard Telkamp (1914–1992), German military personnel
Mieke Telkamp (1934–2016), Dutch singer